Oleksandr Kovalenko may refer to:

 Oleksandr Kovalenko (footballer, born 1974) (born 1974), Ukrainian footballer, goalkeeper
 Oleksandr Kovalenko (footballer) (1976-2010), Ukrainian footballer
 Oleksandr Mykhailovych Kovalenko (1875-1963), Ukrainian political activist, scientist, military officer, writer
 Oleksandr Mykolayovych Kovalenko (1935-2021), Ukrainian economist and politician

See also
 Kovalenko